Radiorama were an Italian Italo disco studio project formed in 1984.

Discography

Studio albums

Compilation albums
 The First Album (1988)
 The Best of Radiorama (1989)
 Golden Hits (1996)
 The Ultimate Collection 1984-1998 (1998)
 The Greatest Hits (2000)
 Greatest Hits and Remixes (2015)

Singles

See also 

 Martinelli (band)
 Raggio Di Luna (Moon Ray)
 Topo & Roby

Citations

External links 

 
 

1984 establishments in Italy
Eurobeat musicians
Italian Eurodance groups
Italo disco groups
Musical groups established in 1984
Epic Records artists